The Korail Class 8200 is a South Korean electric locomotive operated by Korail. This locomotive has head-end power capabilities in place of a dynamo car, which could be used with up to 12 passenger cars.

Technical details
This locomotive is based on the Siemens EuroSprinter model ES64F, assembled by Rotem. With four 1300 kW electric motors, the total power output is 5200 kW. The maximum speed is 150 km/h, although changing the bogies would allow  220 km/h.

Running lines
After the introduction of the 8200, Korail made a trial run in Chungbuk Line, which had just been electrified. After electrifying several lines such as Jungang, Taebaek, Gyeongbu, Yeongdong and Honam Line, it is used for Mugunghwa trains with maximum speed of 150 km/h.

HEP Issues
The head-end power feature of 8200s has caused some problems in Korea. Power generated by regenerative brake has limits, and if the locomotive has many carriages, the head-end power supply will be insufficient. Because of this problem, a dynamo car is attached when operating with 5 or more passenger cars in case of emergency.

References

Bibliography

External links

Korail 8200

Bo-Bo locomotives
Electric locomotives of South Korea
Railway locomotives introduced in 2003
Siemens locomotives
Standard gauge locomotives of South Korea
25 kV AC locomotives